Marcus Rex,  (11 September 1886 – 28 September 1971) was the last British Resident of Perak

Education and career
Rex's early education was at Highgate School, London, after which he gained a Bachelor of Arts (BA) degree from Trinity College, Cambridge in 1908. Rex began his service as a Malayan Civil Service cadet in 1910, he was soon promoted to Assistant to the Resident of Perak in 1912 and 1915. Rex also posted as District Officer of Kuala Kangsar in 1913. In 1917, he became the Superintendent of Opium in the State of Selangor, Negeri Sembilan and Pahang. Rex became the District Officer of Raub in 1919. He was the British Secretary for Federated Malay States in 1935 – 1936 and the last British Resident of Perak 1939 - 1941.

Rex was invested with Companion of the Most Distinguished Order of St. Michael and St. George (CMG) in 1941.

References

External links
Marcus Rex
The Dominions Office

1886 births
1971 deaths
People educated at Highgate School
Administrators in British Malaya
History of Perak
British diplomats